Vettukadu  is a village in the Annavasal revenue block of Pudukkottai district, Tamil Nadu, India.

Demographics 

As per the 2001 census, Vettukadu had a total population of 2108 with 1027 males and 1081 females. Out of the total population 893    people were literate.

References

Villages in Pudukkottai district